Sebastián Martínez (born as Sebastián Martínez on January 7, 1983 in Medellín, Colombia), is a Colombian actor.

Filmography

Films

Television

Awards and nominations

References

External links 

1981 births
21st-century Colombian male actors
Colombian male film actors
Colombian male telenovela actors
Living people
People from Medellín